Claire Jennifer Tomlin (born 1969 Southampton, England) is a British researcher in hybrid systems, distributed and decentralized optimization and control theory and holds the Charles A. Desoer Chair at the University of California,  at Berkeley.

Career
She graduated from the University of Waterloo with a B.A.Sc. in electrical engineering in 1992, from Imperial College London with a M.Sc. in electrical engineering in 1993, and from the University of California, Berkeley with a PhD in electrical engineering and computer sciences in 1998. She held the positions of assistant, associate, and full professor at the Department of Aeronautics and Astronautics and the Department of Electrical Engineering at Stanford University from 1998-2007, where she was a director of the Hybrid Systems Laboratory. She currently holds the Charles A. Desoer Chair in Engineering at UC Berkeley.

Prof. Tomlin's research focuses on applications, unmanned aerial vehicles, air traffic control and modeling of biological processes. She was named a MacArthur Fellow in September 2006.

Honours 
She received the Erlander Professorship of the Swedish Research Council in 2009, a MacArthur Fellowship in 2006, and the Eckman Award of the American Automatic Control Council in 2003. In 2003, she was named to the MIT Technology Review TR100 as one of the top 100 innovators in the world under the age of 35.

She became a Fellow of the IEEE in 2010. She was awarded the IEEE Transportation Technologies Award in 2017 "for contributions to air transportation systems, focusing on collision avoidance protocol design and avionics safety verification". She was elected a fellow of the American Institute for Medical and Biological Engineering (AIMBE) in 2016 for "outstanding contributions to the development of mathematical models that link molecular networks to the cellular processes they control".
She was elected to the American Academy of Arts and Sciences in 2019. In 2020 she was named a Fellow of the International Federation of Automatic Control.

Works

See also
 List of University of Waterloo people

References

External links 
 Personal Website
 Hybrid Systems Laboratory

Stanford University School of Engineering faculty
American electrical engineers
MacArthur Fellows
1969 births
Living people
UC Berkeley College of Engineering alumni
UC Berkeley College of Engineering faculty
Alumni of Imperial College London
Control theorists
Fellows of the American Academy of Arts and Sciences
Fellows of the International Federation of Automatic Control